Siemaszkoa is a genus of fungi in the family Laboulbeniaceae. The genus contain 7 species.

The genus was circumscribed by Isabelle Irene Tavares and Tomasz Majewski in Mycotaxon vol.3 (2) on page 202 in 1976. 

The genus name of Siemaszkoa is in honour of Janina Siemaszko (1895–1968), who was a Polish botanist and mycologist, was also interested in Virology and Entomology.

Species
As accepted by Species Fungorum;
 Siemaszkoa annae 
 Siemaszkoa fennica 
 Siemaszkoa flexa 
 Siemaszkoa ptenidii 
 Siemaszkoa pusillima 
 Siemaszkoa ramificans 
 Siemaszkoa valida

References

External links
Siemaszkoa at Index Fungorum

Laboulbeniomycetes